Daniil Nikolayevich Nikolayev (born 10 May 2002) is a Russian football player. He plays for FC Druzhba Maykop.

Club career
He made his debut for the main squad of FC Rostov on 27 October 2021 in a Russian Cup game against FC Torpedo Moscow.

Career statistics

References

External links
 
 
 
 

2002 births
Living people
Russian footballers
Association football midfielders
FC Rostov players
FC Druzhba Maykop players
Russian Second League players